Elections to Buckinghamshire County Council took place on 4 June 2009 as part of the 2009 United Kingdom local elections, having been delayed from 7 May, to coincide with elections to the European Parliament.

All locally registered electors (British, Irish, Commonwealth and European Union citizens) who were aged 18 or over on Thursday 4 June 2009 were entitled to vote in the local elections. Those who were temporarily away from their ordinary address (for example, away working, on holiday, in student accommodation or in hospital) were also entitled to vote in the local elections, although those who had moved abroad and registered as overseas electors cannot vote in the local elections. It is possible to register to vote at more than one address (such as a university student who had a term-time address and lives at home during holidays) at the discretion of the local Electoral Register Office, but it remains an offence to vote more than once in the same local government election.

Result

The overall turnout was 40.50% with a total of 190,795 valid votes cast. A total of 843 ballots were rejected.

Council Composition
Following the last election in 2005 the composition of the council was:

After the election, the composition of the council was:

L - Labour

Ward Results
Asterisks denote incumbent Councillors seeking re-election. Councillors seeking re-election were elected in 2005, and results are compared to that year's polls on that basis. All results are listed below:

Abbey

Alderbourne

Amersham

Aston Clinton

Aylesbury East

Aylesbury North

Aylesbury South

Aylesbury South East

Aylesbury West

Beaconsfield

Bernwood

Booker, Cressex & Sands

Bowerdean, Micklefield & Totteridge

Both Julia Wassell and Chaudhary Ditta were previously elected as Labour councillors.

Buckingham North

Buckingham South

Bulstrode

Burnham Beeches

Chalfont St Peter

Chesham East

Chesham North West

Chess Valley

Chiltern Ridges

Chiltern Valley

Downley, Disraeli, Oakridge & Castlefield

Gerards Cross & Denham North

Great Brickhill

Great Missenden

Greater Hughenden

Grendon Underwood

Haddenham

Hazlemere

Icknield and Bledlow

Iver

Ivinghoe

Marlow

Penn, Coleshill & Holmer Green

Ryemead, Tylers Green & Loudwater

Stoke Poges & Farnham Common

Stokenchurch, Radnage & West Wycombe

Taplow, Dorney & Lent Rise

Terriers & Amersham Hill

Thames

The Chalfonts & Seer Green

The Risboroughs

Wendover & Halton

Wing

Winslow

References

Buckinghamshire County Council elections
2009 English local elections
2000s in Buckinghamshire